El Guarco is a canton in the Cartago province of Costa Rica. The head city is in Tejar district.

Toponymy
Named after El Guarco, a cacique in the colonial era.

History 
El Guarco was created on 26 July 1939 by decree 195.

Geography 
El Guarco has an area of  km² and a mean elevation of  metres.

El Guarco is an elongated canton that stretches southeast from its capital city to encompass a swatch of the Cordillera de Talamanca (Talamanca Mountain Range). The Pan-American Highway, locally designated as Route 2, delineates the canton's lengthy southwestern border.

Districts 
The canton of El Guarco is subdivided into the following districts:
 Tejar
 San Isidro
 Tobosi
 Patio de Agua

Demographics 

For the 2011 census, El Guarco had a population of  inhabitants.

Transportation

Road transportation 
The canton is covered by the following road routes:

References 

Cantons of Cartago Province
Populated places in Cartago Province